Global Rights is an international human rights capacity-building non-governmental organization (NGO).  Founded in Washington, D.C., in 1978 with the name International Human Rights Law Group, the organization changed its name to Global Rights: Partners for Justice in 2003 on the occasion of its 25th anniversary. In December 2014 it shut its Washington headquarters and devolved the center of its operations to its country office in Nigeria and Burundi from where the organization continues to work with local activists in Africa to promote and protect the rights of marginalized populations. It provided technical assistance and training to enable local partners to document and expose human rights abuses, conduct community outreach and mobilization, advocate for legal and policy reform, and provide legal and paralegal services.

Global Rights amplifies the voices of grassroots activists and organizations, and builds their capacity to address inequalities and human rights violations and bring their struggles to the attention of regional and international institutions such as the United Nations and African Court on Human and Peoples' Rights, which develop and enforce human rights standards.

The organization's model works and builds impact from the broad base of society upwards, teaching and training coalitions, organizations and individuals with a participatory approach that fosters long-term transparency and sustainable change. Global Rights is distinctive in its grass roots approach that strengthens activists to document and expose human rights abuses, conduct community outreach and mobilization, advocate for legal and policy reform, and provide legal and paralegal services. Their goals is to increase access to justice for poor and marginalized groups, promote women’s rights and gender equality, and advance ethnic and racial equality. They also work through special initiatives for The protection of the Rights of Civilians in Armed Conflicts and natural resources and human rights.

Global Rights’ programs address governance failures that exacerbate the disenfranchisement and the violations of the rights of the poor and marginalized, women and victims of discrimination. While the need for action is universal, no one model is uniformly applicable and all programs are customized to local needs and conditions.

Thematic Programs 
Source:

Access to justice, as defined by the United Nations Development Program are understood and accepted within the international human rights community, this means that laws and remedies must be just, equitable, and sensitive to the needs of the poor and marginalized. At the same time, difficulties encountered by vulnerable populations in understanding and asserting their legal rights require the attention of legal institutions. Equal access to justice, whether through the courts or other legal mechanisms, therefore creates a crucial precondition for broad-based prosperity and security under the rule of law.

Where there is a real or perceived breakdown of rule of law, and where political, legal, economic, and institutional biases and barriers marginalize segments of the population, equal access to justice is not a given.

Global Rights therefore focuses on vulnerable populations and their legal challenges. They help the poor and marginalized access legal systems, thereby increasing governmental accountability and public faith in the rule of law.
Natural Resources and Human Rights
For extractive host communities, expectations of a better life are too often replaced by an overwhelming sense of injustice. They lose their lands and livelihoods, grapple with pollution affecting their environment and health, see women disproportionately affected, and have little or no say in the processes that determine if and how their resource rich lands will be exploited. Their compounding frustrations are often expressed through violence, contributing to increased insecurity.

Global Rights therefore partners with civil society organizations and extractive host communities to strengthen their ability to prevent, monitor and document human rights violations and abuses, and to design and implement engagement and advocacy strategies with the government, companies, and other identified stakeholders.

Women’s Rights and Gender Equality
Women's rights and gender equality is at the core of Global Rights' work. Our particular emphasis on the rights of women is woven through all of our initiatives and also as standalone program. We have been working in Northern Nigeria for over a decade by building the capacity of local activists to provide community based paralegal services (legal first aid) to indigent women who are particularly vulnerable given the paucity of access to justice in the region. Our paralegal services partners work alongside indigent women to ensure that they can understand and assert their rights in cases involving issues such as forced marriage, child custody,  domestic and sexual violence.

Top priorities on our women’s rights and gender equality program are sexual and gender based violence, women’s participation in democratic life and their access to socio-economic opportunities, ensuring gender mainstreaming in every facet of national life.

Security and Human Rights
In recent years, both the nature and extent of human rights violations have significantly worsened concurrent with rising insecurity and violence. Most of these violations play out in the theatre of the ongoing insurgency and the counter-terrorism operations of security forces, with limited opportunities for redress for victims. In this militarized situation, there is little state accountability and vulnerable populations have become victims of indiscriminate attacks by both the military and insurgents, who act without adherence to the norms of the standards care for civilians.
Global Rights therefore works with vulnerable groups and communities to demand accountability of security forces and ensure the rights of citizens are promoted and protected. We do this by promoting adherence to the rule of law even in asymmetrical warfare, amplifying the voices of indigent communities caught between government security forces and insurgents, and are particularly at risk of having their basic human rights violated, given the often long histories of weak governance, inadequate resources and lack of basic understanding of their rights; and how to hold government accountable for their protection.

Global Rights believes local knowledge and expertise are essential to successful administration. Their local partners know the communities in which they work, are familiar with their cultures and traditions, and were already active in promoting the legal rights of the poor and marginalized. Global Rights recognized that long-term, systemic change could occur only if stakeholders themselves were involved. By transferring knowledge and skills to local partners, Global Rights ensures that they can maintain a culture of participatory governance and human rights, long after their projects are over.

Executive Director
Gay McDougall was Executive Director of Global Rights from 1994 to 2014. She was one of 16 commissioners on the Independent Electoral Commission helping to ensure fair elections after the fall of apartheid in South Africa in 1994. In her time Global Rights has done work in Cambodia helping to address the lack of legal services since the Khmer Rouge killed the bulk of the country's attorneys.

References 

International human rights organizations
International LGBT political advocacy groups